Delamination is a mode of failure where a material fractures into layers. A variety of materials including laminate composites and concrete can fail by delamination. Processing can create layers in materials such as steel formed by rolling and plastics and metals from 3D printing which can fail from layer separation. Also, surface coatings such as paints and films can delaminate from the coated substrate.

In laminated composites, the adhesion between layers often fails first causing the layers to separate. For example, in fiber-reinforced plastics, sheets of high strength reinforcement (e.g., carbon fiber, fiberglass) are bound together by a much weaker polymer matrix (e.g., epoxy). In particular, loads applied perpendicular to the high strength layers, and shear loads can cause the polymer matrix to fracture or the fiber reinforcement to debond from the polymer.

Delamination also occurs in reinforced concrete when metal reinforcements near the surface corrode. The oxidized metal has a larger volume causing stresses when confined by the concrete. When the stresses exceed the strength of the concrete cracks can form and spread to join with neighboring cracks caused by corroded rebar creating a fracture plane that runs parallel to the surface. Once the fracture plane has developed, the concrete at the surface can separate from the substrate.

Processing can create layers in materials which can fail by delamination. In concrete, surfaces can flake off from improper finishing. If the surface is finished and densified by troweling while the underlying concrete is bleeding water and air, the dense top layer may separate from the water and air pushing upwards. In steels, rolling can create a microstructure when the microscopic grains are oriented in flat sheets which can fracture into layers. Also, certain 3D printing methods (e.g., Fused Deposition) builds parts in layers that can delaminate during printing or use. When printing thermoplastics with fused deposition, cooling a hot layer of plastic applied to a cold substrate layer can cause bending due to differential thermal contraction and layer separation.

Inspection methods 
There are multiple nondestructive testing methods to detect delamination in structures including visual inspection, tap testing (i.e. sounding), ultrasound, radiography, and infrared imaging.

Visual inspection is useful for detecting delaminations at the surface and edges of materials. However, a visual inspection may not detect delamination within a material without cutting the material open.

Tap testing or sounding involves gently striking the material with a hammer or hard object to find delamination based on the resulting sound. In laminated composites, a clear ringing sound indicates a well bonded material whereas a duller sound indicates the presence of delamination due to the defect dampening the impact. Tap testing is well suited for finding large defects in flat panel composites with a honeycomb core whereas thin laminates may have small defects that are not discernible by sound. Using sound is also subjective and dependent on the inspector's quality of hearing as well as judgement.  Any intentional variations in the part may also change the pitch of the produced sound, influencing the inspection.  Some of these variations include ply overlaps, ply count change gores, core density change (if used), and geometry.

In reinforced concretes intact regions will sound solid whereas delaminated areas will sound hollow. Tap testing large concrete structures is carried about either with a hammer or with a chain dragging device for horizontal surfaces like bridge decks. Bridge decks in cold climate countries which use de-icing salts and chemicals are commonly subject to delamination and as such are typically scheduled for annual inspection by chain-dragging as well as subsequent patch repairs of the surface.

Delamination resistance testing methods

Coating delamination tests 

ASTM provides standards for paint adhesion testing which provides qualitative measures for paints and coatings resistance to delamination from substrates. Tests include cross-cut test, scrape adhesion, and pull-off test.

Interlaminar fracture toughness testing 
Fracture toughness is a material property that describes resistance to fracture and delamination. It is denoted by critical stress intensity factor  or critical strain energy release rate . For unidirectional fiber reinforced polymer laminate composites, ASTM provides standards for determining mode I fracture toughness  and mode II fracture toughness  of the interlaminar matrix. During the tests load  and displacement  is recorded for analysis to determine the strain energy release rate from the compliance method.  in terms of compliance is given by

Mode I interlaminar fracture toughness 

ASTM D5528 specifies the use of the double cantilever beam (DCB) specimen geometry for determining mode I interlaminar fracture toughness. A double cantilever beam specimen is created by placing a non-stick film between reinforcement layers in the center of the beam before curing the polymer matrix to create an initial crack of length . During the test the specimen is loaded in tension from the end of the initial crack side of the beam opening the crack. Using the compliance method, the critical strain energy release rate is given by

Typically, equation 2 overestimates the fracture toughness because the two cantilever beams of the DCB specimen will have a finite rotation at the crack. The finite rotation can be corrected for by calculating  with a slightly longer crack with length  giving

The crack length correction  can be calculated experimentally by plotting the least squares fit of the cube root of the compliance  vs. crack length . The correction  is the absolute value of the x intercept. Fracture toughness can also be corrected with the compliance calibration method where  given by

where  is the slope of the least squares fit of  vs. .

Mode II interlaminar fracture toughness 

Mode II interlaminar fracture toughness can be determined by an edge notch flexure test specified by ASTM D7905. The specimen is prepared in a similar manner as the DCB specimen introducing an initial crack with length  before curing the polymer matrix. If the test is performed with the initial crack (non-precracked method) the candidate fracture toughness  is given by

.

References 

Composite materials
Mechanical failure modes